The military specification referred to as MIL-DTL-5541, "Military Specification, Chemical Conversion Coatings on Aluminum and Aluminum Alloys" covers chemical conversion coatings formed by the reaction of chemical conversion materials with the surfaces of aluminum and aluminum alloys. The current specification (2009) is MIL-DTL-5541F, which superseded MIL-C-5541E in July 2006. The specification is approved for use by all departments and agencies of the United States Department of Defense (DoD). Although prepared specifically for DoD applications, the standard is used for many commercial applications as well. It has gained world wide use across many fields versus the more verbose ISO equivalent (i.e., ISO 8081:1985, Aerospace process, Chemical conversion coating for aluminum alloys, General purpose). Note that chromate conversion coatings have been used for over 50 years as treatment to coated or as-fabricated surfaces to boost corrosion resistance and provide a good basis for the subsequent application of paint. However, these treatments use hexavalent chromium chemicals that are extremely toxic. This has led to progressively greater restrictions, imposed by national and international legislation, related to concerns over health and safety and environmental protection, on the use of these treatments.

Scope of the Standard
The MIL-DTL-5541 specification covers chemical conversion coatings that form protective coatings by chemical reaction with aluminum and aluminum alloy; these coatings are categorized by the following types and classes.

Type I: Addresses compositions containing hexavalent chromium. This film typically appears to be gold or brown in color, but in some cases may be optionally specified as having no color (Having no color is described as "clear").
Type II: Addresses compositions containing no hexavalent chromium.  This film typically appears to have no color (Having no color is described as "clear").

AND

Class 1A: Provides maximum protection against corrosion, whether painted or unpainted. This is a relatively thick coating used as a final finish or pre-treatment to paint or powder coating.
Class 3: Provides protection against corrosion where low electrical resistance is required. This is a thin coating providing low contact resistance, and the coating weight is lower as is the corrosion resistance.  There may be some advantages using this thinner film in bonding applications.

Related Documents
The Ministry of Defence (United Kingdom) document entitled Defense Standard 03-18: Chromate Conversion Coatings (Chromate Filming Treatments). Grades: Standard and Brushing for Aluminium and Aluminium Alloys provides requirements for the chromate conversion Coatings and chromate filming treatments) for aluminium and aluminium alloys.  The current revision (2012) of DEF STAN 03-18 Issue 5 was published January 17, 2012.
The ISO document entitled ISO 8081:1985, Aerospace process, Chemical conversion coating for aluminum alloys, General purpose describes the requirements for producing and testing the coatings, as well as giving information on technical requirements, quality assurance provisions, packaging and delivery.

Intended Usage
The conversion coatings are intended for use on aluminum and aluminum alloy substrates that are not anodized. They are used to repair anodized coatings on aluminum. They are designated as a post treatment to ion-vapor deposition (IVD) aluminum used on many military platforms as a cadmium alternative or galvanic corrosion inhibitor. Type I and II conversion coatings provide corrosion protection on unpainted items, as well as improve adhesion of paint finish systems on aluminum and aluminum alloys. The conversion coatings covered by this specification exceed most commercially available products. This is a requirement due to their use on military aircraft.

Class 1A: These chemical conversion coatings provide corrosion prevention on unpainted items and they improve adhesion of paint finish systems on aluminum and aluminum alloys. Coatings of this type may be used, for example, on tanks, tubing, and component structures where paint finishes are not required for interior surfaces, but are required for the exterior surfaces.
Class 3:  These chemical conversion coatings provide a corrosion preventive film for electrical and electronic applications where lower-resistance contacts, relative to class 1A coatings, and anodic coatings in accordance with MIL-A-8625, are required. Because Class 3 coatings are thinner they are more susceptible to corrosion than class 1A coatings. If it is required to paint areas surrounding electrical Class 3 coatings improve adhesion of paint systems on aluminum and aluminum alloy material. Keep in mind that un-coated aluminum will naturally oxidize if left un-coated. If your goal is to ground to the surface of your aluminum part, then a thin class 3 coating keeps the oxide from building up and provides a better surface for grounding to be accomplished. Also keep in mind that chemical conversion coating is not conductive, so to accomplish a good ground, sufficient pressure is required between the parts .

External links
https://quicksearch.dla.mil/

Corrosion prevention
Military of the United States standards